Deidre Leanne Brock (born 8 December 1961) is an Australian-born Scottish National Party (SNP) politician. She was first elected as the Member of Parliament (MP) for Edinburgh North and Leith in May 2015 — the first SNP representative to hold the seat at either a Westminster or Scottish Parliament level. She has been the SNP House of Commons Business Spokesperson since December 2022.

Early life
Brock was born in Western Australia and grew up in Perth. Her father emigrated from England in his teens. Hence, she is a dual British and Australian national. She studied English at Curtin University and graduated with a BA, then studied acting at the Western Australian Academy of Performing Arts. In 1990, while working as an actress she appeared in an episode of the soap opera Home and Away. She moved to Scotland in 1996 to live with her partner, having met him when she visited the country on holiday a year earlier.

Political career
Brock worked for Rob Gibson MSP before being elected as a SNP Councillor on the City of Edinburgh Council for the Leith Walk ward in 2007 where she topped the poll with 2,550 first preferences. She was re-elected in the 2012 elections, again topping the poll with 1,735 first preferences, and subsequently became the Deputy Lord Provost of Edinburgh as the SNP and Scottish Labour formed an arrangement to run the council.

She was elected as MP for Edinburgh North and Leith in 2015 as part of the SNP landslide receiving 23,742 votes (a 40.9% share), defeating the Labour Party MP, Mark Lazarowicz, by 5,597 votes and a majority of 9.6%. Brock was one of several SNP MPs who took their parliamentary oaths in both Gaelic and English. She was re-elected MP for the same constituency in 2017 with 19,243 votes (34% share) and a 1,625 (2.9%) vote majority over the second placed Labour candidate. Brock was elected in the 2019 general election, greatly increasing her majority by over 10,000 votes to 12,808 (21.6%) and receiving 25,925 votes in total giving a vote share of 43.7% - her highest in the seat to date.

Brock is currently the Shadow SNP Spokesperson for the Environment, Food and Rural Affairs. She was previously the Spokesperson for Devolved Government Relations, Northern Ireland and Fair Work and Employment.

Other activities 
She has been a board member for the Edinburgh International Festival Council, the Centre for the Moving Image, and Creative Edinburgh.

References

External links
 profile on SNP website

 
 

Living people
Actresses from Perth, Western Australia
Australian emigrants to Scotland
Australian people of English descent
Australian soap opera actresses
Councillors in Edinburgh
Curtin University alumni
Female members of the Parliament of the United Kingdom for Scottish constituencies
Members of the Parliament of the United Kingdom for Edinburgh constituencies
Place of birth missing (living people)
Scottish National Party MPs
UK MPs 2015–2017
UK MPs 2017–2019
UK MPs 2019–present
21st-century Scottish women politicians
21st-century Scottish politicians
1961 births
Women councillors in Scotland